Mean Streak is the fifth studio album by American heavy metal band Y&T, released in 1983 through A&M Records. Major hits include "Midnight in Tokyo" (inspired by the band's live show in Tokyo), "Sentimental Fool", and the opening track, "Mean Streak". The album peaked at number 103 on the Billboard 200 on October 27, 1983.

This was the third of five studio albums released by A&M Records for Y&T. Loudwire ranked the album at number 28 on their list of the Top 30 hair metal albums. AllMusic said the hard rock album was a disappointment to the band's fans who knew that their live shows were much better. Metal Forces and Blabbermouth.net called out the combination of hard rock and heavy metal songs on the album, with Blabbermouth praising the title track as the band's best song.

Track listing

Personnel

Y&T
Dave Meniketti – lead guitar, lead vocals
Joey Alves – rhythm guitar, backing vocals
Phil Kennemore – bass, backing vocals, Moog Taurus pedals
Leonard Haze – drums, percussion

Production
Chris Tsangarides – producer, first engineer
Mike Herbick, Richie Corsello – second engineers
Nigel James – arranger
Scott Boorey – assistant engineer
Bernie Grundman – mastering
Chuck Beeson – art direction
John Taylor Dismukes – front cover illustration
Mike Fink – rear cover design
Larry Du Pont – rear cover photo tinting

Charts

References

Y&T albums
Albums produced by Chris Tsangarides
A&M Records albums
1983 albums
Glam metal albums